Li Hongchen (born October 29, 1975 in Mudanjiang, Heilongjiang) is an internationally elite curler who trains out of Harbin, China.

Most of Li's experience at the World level has been as a coach, mainly working with the women and junior teams from 2003 to 2009.

He was added to the Chinese national team at the beginning of the 2009/2010 season. Some sources list him as the Lead for the team; however, the official release from the World Curling Federation lists him as the Alternate for the Chinese Olympic Team.

Teammates 
2010 Vancouver Olympic Games
Wang Fengchun, Skip
Liu Rui, Third
Xu Xiaoming, Second
Zang Jialang, Lead

References 

1975 births
Living people
Chinese male curlers
Curlers at the 2010 Winter Olympics
Olympic curlers of China
People from Mudanjiang
Sportspeople from Heilongjiang
Pacific-Asian curling champions
Chinese curling coaches